Scott Adam Rice (born September 21, 1981) is an American former professional baseball pitcher. A first-round draft pick in the 1999 MLB Draft, his career was slowed by injuries.  He pitched in minor league baseball for 14 seasons before his first promotion to Major League Baseball (MLB) in 2013. He made his MLB debut with the New York Mets on April 1, 2013.

Career
Rice attended Royal High School in Simi Valley, California. He played for the high school baseball team as a pitcher. The Baltimore Orioles drafted Rice in the first round, with the 44th overall selection, of the 1999 Major League Baseball Draft. He played in minor league baseball for the Orioles organization through 2005, reaching Class AA, then signed with the Texas Rangers in 2006, reaching Class AAA. He made only eight appearances in 2007 due to injury, and had surgery on his flexor tendon in 2008.

Rice returned to baseball pitching in independent leagues, playing for the Long Island Ducks in 2008 and the Newark Bears in 2009. He then pitched in the Colorado Rockies organization in 2010 and for the Chicago Cubs in spring training in 2011, but was released.

Rice joined the York Revolution of the Atlantic League in 2011. During the season, the Los Angeles Dodgers signed Rice and assigned him to their Class AA minor league team. The Dodgers invited Rice to spring training in 2012, but he did not make the team, and was instead assigned to pitch for the Albuquerque Isotopes of the Class AAA Pacific Coast League (PCL).

New York Mets
Invited to spring training by the New York Mets in 2013, Rice made the Mets' Opening Day roster, the first time he was named to an MLB roster after 480 appearances in 14 minor league seasons. He made his MLB debut on April 1, 2013, striking out Nick Hundley and Cameron Maybin and retiring Will Venable on a ground out in one inning of work. Rice made 73 appearances, and recorded a 3.71 earned run average (ERA).

After struggling through the start of 2014 season, pitching to a 5.93 ERA and 1.98 walks plus hits per inning pitched in 32 appearances, the Mets demoted Rice to the Las Vegas 51s of the PCL on June 23. He underwent elbow surgery in July to remove a bone spur. The Mets removed Rice from the 40-man roster after the 2014 season, making him a free agent. Rice re-signed with the Mets on a minor league deal with an invite to spring training in December.

Arizona Diamondbacks
Rice signed a minor league contract with the Arizona Diamondbacks in December 2015. He was released on May 9, 2016.

York Revolution
Rice resigned with the York Revolution of the Atlantic League of Professional Baseball. This marked Rice's return to York for the first time since 2011. He became a free agent after the 2016 season.

References

External links

1981 births
Living people
Aberdeen IronBirds players
Albuquerque Isotopes players
American expatriate baseball players in Canada
Arizona League Rangers players
Baseball players from California
Bluefield Orioles players
Bowie Baysox players
Chattanooga Lookouts players
Clinton LumberKings players
Colorado Springs Sky Sox players
Delmarva Shorebirds players
Estrellas Orientales players
American expatriate baseball players in the Dominican Republic
Frederick Keys players
Frisco RoughRiders players
Gulf Coast Orioles players
Las Vegas 51s players
Long Island Ducks players
Major League Baseball pitchers
New York Mets players
Newark Bears players
Ottawa Lynx players
People from Simi Valley, California
Phoenix Desert Dogs players
San Antonio Missions players
Sportspeople from Ventura County, California
Tulsa Drillers players
York Revolution players